Youssoupha N'Diaye (born 7 October 1997) is a Senegalese professional footballer who plays as a centre-back for French  club Stade Briochin on loan from Paris FC.

Career
On 17 May 2020, N'Diaye transferred to Ligue 2 club Paris FC from Championnat National side Lyon-Duchère. He made his professional debut with Paris FC in a 3–0 league win over FC Chambly on 22 August 2020.

On 17 January 2023, N'Diaye was loaned to Stade Briochin in Championnat National.

References

External links
 
 OL Profile

1997 births
People from Dakar Region
Living people
Senegalese footballers
Association football defenders
FC Lyon players
Lyon La Duchère players
Paris FC players
Stade Briochin players
Ligue 2 players
Championnat National players
Championnat National 3 players
Senegalese expatriate footballers
Senegalese expatriate sportspeople in France
Expatriate footballers in France